The Blue Hole is a fresh water pond located in Castalia, Erie County, Ohio, in the United States.

The Blue Hole was known to American Indians and was first recorded in history in 1761.

Water temperature is about  throughout the year. Floods and droughts have no effect on temperature or water level. The Blue Hole is fed by a passing underground stream which discharges  of water daily into Sandusky Bay to the north, feeding into Lake Erie. The water contains lime, soda, magnesia and iron, and because the Blue Hole is anoxic, it cannot naturally sustain fish. The surrounding terrain is developed on limestone bedrock and exhibits karst topography due to dissolution of the limestone by ground water, creating a water-filled sinkhole. 

Several similar blue holes are known to local residents. The Blue Hole that once was a tourist attraction is now off limits to the public.  It is located on the grounds of Castalia Trout Club, a privately owned fishing club. It is to be distinguished from another hole, similar in size and eerie bluish-green color, owned by the Castalia State Fish Hatchery and operated by the Ohio Department of Natural Resources, Division of Wildlife, which is open for public viewing and which has grown in popularity since the closure of the Blue Hole in the late 1990s.

See also 
 Blue Hole (New Mexico)
 List of sinkholes of the United States

References 

Powers, David. "Castalia Sings the Blues," Cleveland Scene, May 27, 1999.
Chabek, Dan. "The Blue Hole," The Buckeye Chronicles, a Compendium of Facts About Ohio History.
Roadside America website
Ver Steeg, Karl. "The Blue Hole of Castalia Ohio Journal of Science: Volume 32, Issue 5 (September, 1932)

Further reading

External links 
Video "Neil takes you to the Blue Hole!" from One Tank Trip broadcast August 19, 2014 (WJW-TV)
Live Search Maps "Birds Eye View" of original Blue Hole and original entrance
   Vintage photograph postcards of Blue Hole

Bodies of water of Erie County, Ohio
Landmarks in Ohio
Lakes of Ohio
Ponds of the United States
Sinkholes of the United States